From the 1911 passage of the Sproul Road Bill to the 1987 adoption of the Location Referencing System, all state highways in the U.S. state of Pennsylvania were defined as legislative routes, while some were also posted as Traffic Routes. Major routes were assigned three- or four-digit numbers, while minor routes were given five-digit numbers in which the first two digits represented the county, in alphabetical order from 1 (Adams) to 66 (York). (Philadelphia County was initially skipped, but later assigned the number 67.) State-aid projects, which were carried out even before 1911, received their own permanent numbers - State Aid Application X (SAA X or A-X). Many short routes or realignments were defined as spur or parallel routes to another route.

Often a route remained on its old alignment, while the signed Traffic Route was moved to a newer bypass with a different number.

1-999

1000-9999

See also

References
Historic County Maps
 

 Legislative